Legend of Yunxi is a 2018 Chinese television series based on the novel Poison Genius Consort  by Jie Mo. It stars Ju Jingyi in the title role, alongside Zhang Zhehan and Merxat. The series airs on iQIYI from June 25 to August 15, 2018 for 48 episodes. Due to its success, an additional 2 episodes was added nearing the series' finale.

Synopsis
The story takes place during a chaotic time when the land has split into three kingdoms - Tian Ning, Western Qiu and Northern Li. The Emperor of Tian Ning is cunning and distrustful, and fears his own brother Long Feiye will rebel against him. To dampen his spirits, the King arranges for Long Feiye to be married to a woman with a scarred face named Han Yunxi.

Han Yunxi is actually a beautiful, kind, and talented woman who comes from a medical family and is exceedingly skilled at detoxifying poisons. She is forced into obeying the decree of the king and becomes Long Feiye’s wife in name only. The empress dowager of Tian Ning forces Yunxi to be a spy for her in exchange for Yunxi’s mother, who disappeared years ago. Circumstances allow her to show off her skills time and again, winning the admiration of Long Feiye. The two slowly develop feelings for each other. At the same time, she also forms a friendship with Gu Qishao, an adversary of Long Feiye.

Cast

Main

Supporting

Tian Ning Palace

Qin manor

Han manor

Yao Gui Valley

Others

Production 
The series is directed by Liu Zhenming, with Li Guoyuan acting as the action choreographer, Chen Tongxue as style director and Zhong Zhipeng as artistic director.

The series began filming on July 10, 2017 at Hengdian World Studios and wrapped up filming on October 8, 2017 after 111 days.

Soundtrack

Reception
The series received much popularity among the audience for its light-hearted and sweet storyline. It was also praised by People's Daily for promoting Chinese culture through beautiful cinematography, costumes and positive character interpretation. 
As of August 2018, it reached 2.3 billion views online. Due to its success, the production team announced an additional two episodes of epilogue, which will be released on August 15 to coincide with the series' finale.

Awards and nominations

References

Chinese romance television series
Chinese historical television series
Television shows based on Chinese novels
2018 Chinese television series debuts
IQIYI original programming
Chinese web series
2018 Chinese television series endings
2018 web series debuts